The Sangihe hanging parrot (Loriculus catamene) is a small (length: 12–13.5 cm) parrot endemic to the small island of Sangihe, north of Sulawesi, Indonesia.

This is an arboreal parrot. It is predominantly green, with a red throat patch, rump, elongated uppertail-coverts and tip of tail.

In 2009 this parrot was downlisted from Endangered to Near Threatened because although it has a very small range within which there has been extensive forest loss and fragmentation, it apparently remains common in degraded and cultivated habitats and there is no evidence of a continuing decline. The current population is estimated at between 10,000 and 46,000 individuals.

References

External links 
 BirdLife Species Factsheet

Sangihe hanging parrot
Birds of the Sangihe Islands
Endemic birds of Sulawesi
Parrots of Asia
Near threatened animals
Near threatened biota of Asia
Sangihe hanging parrot